Colom may refer to:

People
Colom (surname)
Colom Keating, American actor and writer

Places
Colom Island, Spain
Passeig de Colom, Barcelona
Roca Colom, mountain of Catalonia

See also
Colm
Colomb
Colomba
Colombe (disambiguation)
 Colum (disambiguation)
Callum (disambiguation)
Colon (disambiguation)
Colón (disambiguation)